Marie-Guillemine Benoist, born Marie-Guillemine de Laville-Leroux (December 18, 1768 – October 8, 1826), was a French neoclassical, historical, and genre painter.

Biography
Benoist was born in Paris, the daughter of a civil servant. Her training as an artist began in 1781 under Élisabeth Vigée Le Brun, and she entered Jacques-Louis David's atelier in 1786 along with her sister Marie-Élisabeth Laville-Leroux.

The poet Charles-Albert Demoustier, who met her in 1784, was inspired by her in creating the character Émilie in his work Lettres à Émilie sur la mythologie (1801).

In 1791, Benoist exhibited for the first time at the Paris Salon, displaying her mythology-inspired picture Psyché faisant ses adieux à sa famille. Another of her paintings of this period, L'Innocence entre la vertu et le vice, is similarly mythological and reveals her feminist interests—in this picture, vice is represented by a man, although it was traditionally represented by a woman. In 1793, she married the lawyer Pierre-Vincent Benoist.

Her work, reflecting the influence of Jacques-Louis David, tended increasingly toward history painting by 1795. In 1800, Benoist exhibited Portrait d'une négresse (as of 2019 renamed Portrait de Madeleine) in the Salon. Six years previously, slavery had been abolished, and this image became a symbol for women's emancipation and black people's rights. James Smalls, a professor of Art History at the University of Maryland, declared that "the painting is an anomaly because it presents a black person as the sole aestheticized subject and object of a work of art." The picture was acquired by Louis XVIII for France in 1818.

An important commission for a full-length portrait of Napoléon Bonaparte—Premier Consul Français in this period—was awarded to her in 1803. This portrait was to be sent to the city of Ghent, newly ceded to France by the Treaty of Lunéville in 1801. Other honors came to her; she was awarded a Gold Medal in the Salon of 1804, and received a governmental allowance. During this time she opened an atelier for the artistic training of women.

Her career was harmed by political developments, however, when her husband, the supporter of royalist causes, Comte Benoist, was nominated in the Conseil d'État during the post-1814 Bourbon Restoration. Despite being at the height of her popularity, "she was obliged to abandon painting" and pursuing women's causes, due in part to her devoir de réserve ("tactful withdrawal") in the face of the growing wave of conservatism in European society.

Works
 Self-portrait, 1786 (Staatliche Kunsthalle Karlsruhe)
 Psyché faisant ses adieux a sa famille (1791)
 L'Innocence entre la vertu et le vice
Portrait of Madeleine (previously known as Portrait d’une négresse (1800, Musée du Louvre))
 Portrait Madame Philippe Panon Debassayns de Richmont and Her Son Eugene (1802, Metropolitan Museum of Art)
 Portrait de Napoléon (1804, court of Ghent)
 Portrait du Maréchal Brune (1805, détruit; une copie se trouve au Musée du Château de Versailles)
 Portrait de Pauline Borghèse (1807, Musée du Château de Versailles)
 Portrait de Marie-Élise, grande duchesse de Toscane (Pinacoteca Nazionale, Lucca)
 Portrait de l’impératrice Marie-Louise (Château de Fontainebleau)
 La lecture de la Bible, (1810, musée municipal, Louviers)
 La Consultation ou La Diseuse de bonne-aventure, Saintes Musée municipal.

Gallery

See also
:fr:Devoir de réserve dans la fonction publique française

References

Bibliography
Marie-Juliette Ballot, Une élève de David, La Comtesse Benoist, L'Émilie de Demoustier, 1768-1826, Plon, Paris, 1914
Astrid Reuter, Marie-Guilhelmine Benoist, Gestaltungsräume einer Künstlerin um 1800, Lukas Verlag, Berlin, 2002

External links

  James Smalls, Slavery is a Woman: "Race," Gender, and Visuality in Marie Benoist's Portrait d'une négresse.
(in English) Paris A. Spies-Gans, "Marie-Guillemine Benoist, Revolutionary Painter," Art Herstory
  Marie-Guillemine Benoist dans Artcyclopedia
 Online pictures on Artnet

1768 births
1826 deaths
Artists from Paris
French women painters
French genre painters
French portrait painters
French neoclassical painters
Pupils of Jacques-Louis David
Sibling artists
18th-century French painters
18th-century French women artists
19th-century French painters
19th-century painters of historical subjects
19th-century French women artists